Amy Lang is an Australian acrobatic gymnast.

Amy Lang may also refer to:

Amy Lang, character in Silk (TV series)
"Who Killed Amy Lang", starring Carol Higgins Clark